Flaveria anomala is a Mexican plant species of yellowtops within the family Asteraceae. It has been found only in northeastern Mexico, in Coahuila, San Luis Potosí, Tamaulipas, Nuevo León, and Zacatecas.

One plant can produce numerous flower heads in a dense spiral array. Each head contains 5-7 yellow disc flowers. some heads contain no ray flowers but other heads in the same cluster may have one yellow ray flower.

References

External links 
photo of herbarium specimen collected in Nuevo León in 1989

anomala
Endemic flora of Mexico
Flora of Northeastern Mexico
Plants described in 1892